Alfonso Molina (born 6 October 1944) is a Nicaraguan boxer. He competed in the men's lightweight event at the 1968 Summer Olympics. In his opening fight at the 1968 Summer Olympics, he lost to Mongi Landhili of Tunisia.

References

External links
 

1944 births
Living people
Nicaraguan male boxers
Olympic boxers of Nicaragua
Boxers at the 1968 Summer Olympics
Sportspeople from Managua
Lightweight boxers